Robert Ford may refer to:

Politics
Robert Ford (politician) (born 1948), member of the South Carolina Senate
Robert MacDonald Ford (1911–2004), Washington state politician
Rob Ford (1969–2016), former Mayor of Toronto

Sports
Bob Ford (basketball) (born 1950), American basketball player
Bob Ford (American football) (born 1937), American football coach
Bob Ford (golfer) (born 1954), American golfer, see Pennsylvania Open Championship
Bobby Ford (born 1974), English footballer
Bobby Ford (Scottish footballer) (born 1949), played for Dundee FC
Robert Ford (sportscaster), American sportscaster for the Houston Astros
Robert Ford (American football) (born 1951), American football coach
Robert Ford (basketball), American basketball head coach for St. Xavier Cougars

Characters
Robert Ford (One Life to Live), a fictional soap opera character
Robert Ford, character in the TV series Westworld

Others
Robert Ford (outlaw) (1862–1892), the man who killed Jesse James
Robert Ford (Canadian diplomat) (1915–1998), poet and Canadian diplomat
Robert Stephen Ford (born 1958), former American ambassador to Syria and former ambassador to Algeria
Robert W. Ford (1923–2013), British radio officer and civil servant in Tibet
Robert Ford (British Army officer) (1923–2015), Adjutant-General to the Forces in the United Kingdom
 Robert B. Ford, President/COO at Abbott Laboratories Inc, CEO since 2020.

See also
Robert Forde (1875–1959), explorer